Facing Your Danger is a 1946 American short film. The cameraman was amateur filmmaker Edwin E. Olsen. Using a Cine-Kodak and 16mm Kodachrome film, Olsen shot the film in 1942 on a Grand Canyon river trip conducted by Norman Nevills. Another amateur cameraman on the trip was Otis R. Marston. When Olsen ran out of film, Marston, who had brought 6,000 feet of Kodachrome magazines, provided Olsen with what he needed. Olsen edited the film and sold it to Warner Brothers in 1946. Lee Anthony and Gordon Hollingshead collaborated to re-edit and shorten the film to a one reel for theater release.

Facing Your Danger won an Oscar at the 19th Academy Awards in 1947 for Best Short Subject (One-Reel). This was the first time an Academy Award went to a film shot by an amateur filmmaker using a 16mm camera.

References

External links
 
 
 

1946 films
1946 documentary films
1946 short films
Live Action Short Film Academy Award winners
Warner Bros. short films
American documentary films
Works about the Grand Canyon
Documentary films about Arizona
1940s English-language films
1940s American films